Many documentary films have been made about the Korean War.

Overview
The Crime of Korea (1950)
Korea: The Forgotten War (1987)
Korea, after the War (1954)
The War in Korea (1988)
Korea: The Unknown War (1988) Our Time in Hell: The Korean War (1997)The Korean War: Fire and Ice (1999)Korean War Stories (2001)Korean War in Color (2001)The Korean War (2001)Korea: The Unfinished War (2003)Korea: The Forgotten War in Colour (2010)Fading Away (2012)Finnigan's War (2013)Keeping the Promise Alive (2013)The Korean War (2013) Fading Away (2014)

Specific Contingents

AustraliaKapyong (2011)

Belgium
 Korea, the Belgian Legacy (2000)

CanadaTest of Will - Canada in the Korean WarIn Korea with Norm ChristieFrance
 Crèvecoeur (1955)

Greece
 Greeks in Korean War (Οι Έλληνες στον πόλεμο της Κορέας) (2007)
 Greece during the Cold War 1950-1980 (Η Ελλάδα στον Ψυχρό Πόλεμο 1950-1980) (2008)

Luxembourg
 Tour of Duty: Luxembourgers of the Korean War (Tour of Duty: Lëtzebuerger am Koreakrich) (2009)

Republic of Korea

Turkey
 The Veterans of the Korean War (Kore Gazileri) (1951)

United StatesCease Fire (1953)Korea: We Called it War (2002)Love Company: Reflections of the Korean War (2010)Uncle Sam Desired Our Presence: Arkansans in the Korean War (2010)Finnigan's War (2013)Keeping the Promise Alive (2013)The Battle of Chosin (2016)KOREA: The Never-Ending War (2020) from PBS

United Kingdom20th Century Battlefields - 1951 Korea (2007)

Prisoners of WarThey Chose China (2005)Keeping the Promise Alive'' (2013)

See also
List of films about the Korean War

References

Korean War
Korean War